Starfield Hanam is shopping complex in Hanam, Gyeonggi Province, South Korea. It is the second largest shopping mall in South Korea.

References

External links
 

Shinsegae Group
Taubman Centers
Shopping malls in South Korea
Buildings and structures in Hanam